Amir Zargari (born  July 31, 1980) is an Iranian former professional racing cyclist. He rode for UCI ProTeam  for the 2012 season.

Major results

Track

1998
 3rd  Points race, Asian Games
1999
 3rd  Team pursuit, Asian Track Championships
2000
 3rd  Team pursuit, UCI Track Cycling World Cup Classics, Ipoh
2001
 Asian Track Championships
2nd  Madison (with Alireza Haghi)
3rd  Elimination race
2002
 Asian Track Championships
1st  Elimination race
2nd  Team pursuit
 2nd  Team pursuit, Asian Games
2003
 Asian Track Championships
2nd  Elimination race
2nd  Team pursuit
3rd  Madison (with Abbas Saeidi Tanha)
2004
 2nd  Team pursuit, Asian Track Championships
2005
 2nd  Team pursuit, Asian Track Championships
2006
 Asian Games
2nd  Team pursuit
3rd  Madison (with Mehdi Sohrabi)
 Asian Track Championships
2nd  Team pursuit
3rd  Madison (with Mehdi Sohrabi)
2007
 Asian Track Championships
2nd  Team pursuit
3rd  Individual pursuit
3rd  Madison (with Mehdi Sohrabi)
2008
 2nd  Team pursuit, Asian Track Championships
2010
 2nd  Points race, Asian Track Championships
2012
 3rd  Madison, Asian Track Championships (with Abbas Saeidi Tanha)
2015
 2nd  Madison, Asian Track Championships (with Arvin Moazzami)

Road

1999
 1st Stage 7 Tour of Turkey
2001
 6th Overall Tour of Saudi Arabia
2005
 National Road Championships
2nd Road race
2nd Time trial
 6th Overall Tour of Turkey
 9th Overall Kerman Tour
2006
 1st Stage 3 Kerman Tour
 Asian Road Championships
2nd  Team time trial
8th Road race
 6th Overall Tour of Azerbaijan (Iran)
1st Stage 7
 8th Overall Tour de East Java
1st Stage 2
2007
 1st Stage 2 Milad De Nour Tour
2008
 2nd Overall Tour de Indonesia
 5th Overall Tour of Thailand
 7th Overall Tour of Hainan
 10th Overall Kerman Tour
1st Stage 2
2009
 National Road Championships
2nd Time trial
5th Road race
 2nd Overall Tour de Singkarak
 4th Overall Milad De Nour Tour
 4th Overall Tour of Azerbaijan (Iran)
 4th Overall Tour de East Java
 6th Overall Tour de Indonesia
 8th Overall Presidential Cycling Tour of Iran
2010
 2nd Overall Tour of Azerbaijan (Iran)
1st Stage 2
 3rd Overall Tour de Singkarak
1st Stages 3 & 5
 3rd Overall Kerman Tour
1st Stage 1
 4th Road race, Asian Road Championships
 4th Overall Milad De Nour Tour
 5th Overall Tour de Langkawi
2011
 1st  Overall Tour de Singkarak
1st Stages 2 & 5
 3rd Overall Milad De Nour Tour
 3rd Overall Tour de Filipinas
 3rd Overall International Presidency Tour
 4th Time trial, National Road Championships
 9th Overall Tour of Qinghai Lake
2012
 National Road Championships
2nd Road race
5th Time trial
 7th Road race, Asian Road Championships
2013
 National Road Championships
2nd Road race
2nd Time trial
 2nd Taiwan KOM Challenge
 7th Overall Tour of Qinghai Lake
 8th Overall Tour de Ijen
2014
 1st  Overall Tour de Singkarak
 3rd Time trial, National Road Championships
 3rd Overall Tour de Ijen
 5th Overall Tour de East Java
2015
 2nd Overall Tour de Singkarak
1st Stage 2
 4th Overall Tour of Japan
 5th Time trial, National Road Championships
 8th Overall Tour de Korea
 8th Overall Tour of Iran (Azerbaijan)
 9th Overall Tour of Fuzhou

References

External links
 
 

1980 births
Living people
Iranian male cyclists
Iranian track cyclists
Cyclists at the 2004 Summer Olympics
Cyclists at the 2012 Summer Olympics
Olympic cyclists of Iran
People from Markazi Province
Asian Games silver medalists for Iran
Asian Games bronze medalists for Iran
Asian Games medalists in cycling
Cyclists at the 1998 Asian Games
Cyclists at the 2002 Asian Games
Cyclists at the 2006 Asian Games
Cyclists at the 2010 Asian Games
Tour of Azerbaijan (Iran) winners
Medalists at the 1998 Asian Games
Medalists at the 2002 Asian Games
Medalists at the 2006 Asian Games
21st-century Iranian people